Pål Alexander Kirkevold (born 10 November 1990) is a Norwegian professional footballer who plays as a forward for HamKam. He has gained one cap for the Norway national team.

Club career
Hailing from Ramnes, he started his youth career in Ramnes IF and also played senior football for IL Ivrig at age 15 before joining Molde FK's junior setup.

He came to HamKam from Molde in 2010. He made his debut for the first team in a 4–1 victory against Raufoss in August 2010.

On 2 December 2011, Kirkevold signed a contract with Mjøndalen. Prior to the 2014 season, he returned to his home region of Vestfold to join Sandefjord. Kirkevold was both top goalscorer with 19 goals and named Player of the Year in the 1. divisjon in 2014, beating the club record of Tom Helge Jacobsen, who had 17 goals in 2001.

Kirkevold played 57 matches and scored 31 goals for Sandefjord, before signing a contract with Hobro IK in the Danish Superliga on 2 August 2015. At the end of March 2016, Kirkevold was loaned out from Hobro to Sarpsborg 08 for the 2016 season. After Hobro relegated, he returned to the club halfway through the season, and was part of the team as they won promotion back to the Superliga. Kirkevold scored the decisive goal when Hobro won 1–0 over Vendsyssel FF the secure their return to the highest level.

In the 2017–18 season, Kirkevold set a new record in the Superliga when he scored in 11 games successive games. The former record was eight games, set by Ebbe Sand and Peter Møller, respectively. He became the league topscorer that season with 22 goals to his name. During his time in Hobro, Kirkevold was nicknamed Mål-Pål (Goal-Pål) for his remarkable goalscoring abilities.

On 26 July 2021 Hobro confirmed, that Kirkevold had returned to Norway and would join a unnamed Norwegian club, rumored to be Stabæk.

International career
On 31 October 2017, Kirkevold gained his first call-up from coach Lars Lagerbäck for Norway for the matches against Macedonia and Slovakia.

On 11 November 2017, he made his international debut for Norway against Macedonia, coming on as a substitute for Alexander Sørloth.

Career statistics

Club

Honours
Sandefjord
Norwegian First Division: 2014

Hobro
Danish 1st Division: 2016–17

Individual
Norwegian First Division Top Scorer: 2014
Norwegian First Division Player of the Year: 2014
Danish Superliga Top Scorer: 2017–18

References

External links
Hobro forlænger Kirkevolds lejeophold, bold.dk, 20 June 2016

1990 births
Living people
People from Re, Norway
Norwegian footballers
Association football forwards
Association football wingers
Norway international footballers
Hamarkameratene players
Mjøndalen IF players
Sandefjord Fotball players
Hobro IK players
Sarpsborg 08 FF players
Eliteserien players
Norwegian First Division players
Danish Superliga players
Danish 1st Division players
Norwegian expatriate footballers
Norwegian expatriate sportspeople in Denmark
Expatriate men's footballers in Denmark
Sportspeople from Vestfold og Telemark